American musician Dwight Yoakam has starred in a number of films and television series ranging from 1992 to the present.

His first major roles included the CBS crime drama P.S. I Luv U and the 1993 movie Red Rock West. In 1996, he had his acting breakthrough in the Billy Bob Thornton movie Sling Blade. For this role, he was nominated for a Screen Actors Guild (SAG) award. Yoakam made his directorial and writing debut in 2000's South of Heaven, West of Hell. Between 2005 and 2006, he also appeared in the movies Bandidas, The Three Burials of Melquiades Estrada, and Wedding Crashers. In 2014, Yoakam had a recurring role in season two of the CBS science fiction series Under the Dome. He also reunited with Thornton for season one of the Amazon Prime Video original series Goliath.

Film

Television

References

American filmographies
Male actor filmographies